This article contains information about the literary events and publications of 2013.

Events
21 January – An annual Orwell Day is instituted.
26 January – Fleeing Islamist insurgents set fire to library buildings in Timbuktu containing manuscripts, mostly in Arabic, dating back to 1204.
7 March – World Book Day becomes a UNESCO-designated event marked in more than 100 countries.
April – J. K. Rowling publishes a detective novel, The Cuckoo's Calling, under the pseudonym Robert Galbraith, with the U.K. publisher Sphere Books. The author's identity is revealed by the media in July.
23 April – World Book Night.
28 April – The Curious Incident of the Dog in the Night-Time, Simon Stephens' stage adaptation of a novel by Mark Haddon, wins a record seven awards at the 2013 Laurence Olivier Awards in London.
1 July – Publisher Penguin Random House is created by a merger.
3 September – The new Library of Birmingham, the largest public library in the U.K., is opened by Malala Yousafzai. Its public spaces are integrated with those of the Birmingham Repertory Theatre.
October – Jo Nesbø reveals himself as Tom Johansen, author of three forthcoming novels.
28 November – Three unpublished works by J. D. Salinger (died 2010), including "The Ocean Full of Bowling Balls", are leaked onto the internet.

Anniversaries
11 February
50th anniversary of the death of Sylvia Plath in 1963
200th anniversary of the birth of Harriet Jacobs in 1813
28 January – 200th anniversary of the publication of Pride and Prejudice in 1813
5 May – 200th anniversary of the birth of Søren Kierkegaard in 1813
2 June – 100th anniversary of the birth of Barbara Pym
29 June – 400th anniversary of the burning of the Globe Theatre during a production of Shakespeare and Fletcher's Henry VIII in 1613
2 August – 25th anniversary of the death of US short story writer Raymond Carver
7 November – 100th anniversary of the birth of Albert Camus
22 November – 50th anniversary of the death of Aldous Huxley

New books

Fiction
Chimamanda Ngozi Adichie – Americanah
José Eduardo Agualusa – A General Theory of Oblivion (Teoria Geral do Esquecimento)
Jacob M. Appel – The Biology of Luck
Kate Atkinson – Life After Life
Dan Brown – Inferno
Adam Christopher – The Burning Dark
J. M. Coetzee – The Childhood of Jesus
Troy Denning – Crucible
Doug Dorst – S.
Richard Flanagan – The Narrow Road to the Deep North
Aminatta Forna – The Hired Man
Frederick Forsyth – The Kill List
Neil Gaiman – The Ocean at the End of the Lane
Elizabeth Graver – The End of the Point
David G. Hartwell (ed.) – Year's best SF 18
Neamat Imam – The Black Coat
Reinhard Jirgl – Nichts von euch auf Erden
Stephen King – Doctor Sleep
Rachel Kushner – The Flamethrowers
Pierre Lemaitre – Au revoir là-haut (The Great Swindle)
Eimear McBride – A Girl Is a Half-formed Thing
Alex Miller – Coal Creek
Haruki Murakami (村上 春樹) – Colorless Tsukuru Tazaki and His Years of Pilgrimage (色彩を持たない多崎つくると、彼の巡礼の年, Tsukuru to, kare no junrei no toshi)
Adam Nevill – House of Small Shadows
Nnedi Okorafor – Kabu-Kabu: Stories
Chuck Palahniuk – Doomed
Rick Riordan – The House of Hades
Veronica Roth – Allegiant
J. K. Rowling (as Robert Galbraith) – The Cuckoo's Calling
Ahmed Saadawi – Frankenstein in Baghdad (فرانكشتاين في بغداد)
M. G. Sanchez – The Escape Artist: a Gibraltarian novel
George Saunders – Tenth of December: Stories
John Scalzi – The Human Division
Sjón – Moonstone – The Boy Who Never Was (Mánasteinn – drengurinn sem aldrei var til)
Robert Stone – Death of the Black-Haired Girl
Donna Tartt – The Goldfinch
Zlatko Topčić – Dagmar
Laura van den Berg – The Isle of Youth (short story collection)
Peter Watts – Beyond the Rift (collected stories)
Tim Winton – Eyrie

Children's and young people
David Almond – Mouse Bird Snake Wolf
Janeen Brian – I'm A Dirty Dinosaur
Nick Bromley – Open Very Carefully
Laura Dockrill – Darcy Burdock
Anthony Horowitz – Russian Roulette
John Hornor Jacobs – The Twelve-Fingered Boy
Chris Lynch – Dead in The Water
Patricia MacLachlan – Cat Talk
Nikki McClure – How To Be A Cat
Rhode Montijo - The Gumazing Gum Girl! Book 1: Chews Your Destiny (August 20)
Chris Raschka – Daisy Gets Lost
Rainbow Rowell
Eleanor & Park
Fangirl
Maggie Stiefvater – The Dream Thieves (second book in The Raven Cycle)
Amy Tintera – Reboot

Drama
Annie Baker – The Flick
Elfriede Jelinek – Die Schutzbefohlenen
Lucy Kirkwood – Chimerica
Stefano Massini – The Lehman Trilogy
Edward Petherbridge and Kathryn Hunter – My Perfect Mind

Poetry

Non-fiction
Saroo Brierley – A Long Way Home
Kate Christensen – Blue Plate Special: An Autobiography of My Appetites
Pat Conroy – The Death of Santini: The Story of a Father and His Son
Jared Diamond – The World Until Yesterday
Craig Dworkin – No Medium
Peter Freeman – The Wallpapered Manse
Malcolm Gladwell – David and Goliath
Ben Goldacre – Bad Pharma
Temple Grandin – The Autistic Brain
Michael Kimmel – Angry White Men
Mark Levin – The Liberty Amendments
Peter H. Maguire - Thai Stick
Diane Muldrow – Everything I Need To Know I Learned From A Little Golden Book
Thomas Piketty – Capital in the Twenty-First Century (Le Capital au XXIe siècle)
Lisa Randall – Higgs Discovery
Sheryl Sandberg – Lean In
Nina Stibbe – Love, Nina: Despatches from Family Life
Jeff VanderMeer – The Illustrated Guide to Creating Imaginative Fiction

Deaths
2 January
Alexei Rudeanu, Romanian writer (born 1939)
Teresa Torańska, Polish journalist and writer (born 1944)
7 January – Maruša Krese, Slovene poet, writer and journalist (born 1947)
10 January – Evan S. Connell, American novelist, poet and short story writer (born 1924)
11 January – Robert Kee, English writer, journalist and broadcaster (born 1919)
18 January – Jacques Sadoul, French novelist, book editor and non-fiction writer (born 1934)
20 January
Yemi Ajibade, Nigerian playwright and actor (born 1929)
Dolores Prida, Cuban-American journalist and playwright (born 1943)
Toyo Shibata (柴田トヨ), Japanese poet (born 1911)
24 January – Richard G. Stern, American novelist and educator (born 1928)
2 February – Sirajul Haq Memon, Pakistani author, journalist and scholar in Sindhi (born 1933)
3 February – Robert Anthony Welch, Irish author and academic (born 1947)
4 February – Margaret Frazer (Gail Lynn Brown), American historical novelist (born 1946)
5 February – Leda Mileva, Bulgarian writer, translator, and diplomat (born 1920)
7 February
Niki Marangou, Cypriot writer and painter (born 1948)
Jonathan Rendall, English author (born 1964)
8 February – Alan Sharp, Scottish-American screenwriter and author (born 1934)
10 February – W. Watts Biggers, American novelist (born 1927)
12 February – Barnaby Conrad, American author (born 1922)
13 February – Oswald LeWinter, Austrian-born American writer (born 1931)
14 February
Glenn Boyer, American author (born 1924)
Mary Brave Bird, American Lakota writer and activist (born 1954)
Friedrich Neznansky, Russian writer (born 1932)
17 February
William Bridges, American author and business consultant (born 1933)
Manoranjan Das, Indian playwright (born 1923)
Debbie Ford, American motivational author (born 1955)
23 February
Maurice Rosy, Belgian comics writer (born 1927)
Sylvia Smith, English writer (born 1945)
24 February – Mahmoud Salem, Egyptian author (born 1931)
26 February
Jan Howard Finder, American science fiction writer (born 1939)
Stéphane Hessel, German-born French author and diplomat (born 1917)
27 February
Molly Lefebure, English writer (born 1919)
Imants Ziedonis, Latvian poet (born 1933)
10 March – Robert Chrisman, American poet, scholar, and critic, co-founder of The Black Scholar (born 1937)
30 March – Daniel Hoffmann, American poet and essayist (born 1923)
1 April – Kildare Dobbs, Canadian author (born 1923)
11 April – Adam Galos, Polish historian (born 1924)
13 April – Nick Pollotta, American science fiction author (born 1954)
20 April
Jocasta Innes, China-born English non-fiction writer (born 1934)
E. L. Konigsburg, American children's novelist and illustrator (born 1930)
22 April – Clément Marchand, Canadian poet and journalist (born 1912)
1 May – Gregory Rogers, Australian children's author and illustrator (born 1957)
12 May – Per Maurseth, Norwegian historian (born 1932)
23 May – William Demby, American author (born 1922)
26 May – Jack Vance, American mystery, fantasy, and science fiction writer (born 1916)
6 June – Tom Sharpe, English comic novelist (born 1928)
9 June – Iain Banks, Scottish novelist (born 1954)
23 June – Richard Matheson, American author and screenwriter (born 1926)
12 July – Elaine Morgan, Welsh writer on anthropology (born 1920)
2 September – Frederik Pohl, American science fiction writer (born 1919)
18 September – Marcel Reich-Ranicki, Polish-born German literary critic (born 1920)
21 September – Kofi Awoonor, Ghanaian poet (shot dead, born 1935)
23 September
Christopher Koch, Australian novelist (born 1932)
Álvaro Mutis, Colombian poet, novelist and essayist (born 1923)
Luciano Vincenzoni, Italian screenwriter (born 1926)
1 October – Tom Clancy, American thriller writer (born 1947)
25 November – Joel Lane, English author, poet, and critic (born 1963)
11 December – Barbara Branden, Canadian-American author (born 1929)

Awards
Akutagawa Prize (Early): Kaori Fujino for Tsume to Me (爪と目) "Nails and Eyes"
Caine Prize for African Writing: Tope Folarin, "Miracle"
Camões Prize: Mia Couto
Danuta Gleed Literary Award: (announced 11 June 2013)
David Cohen Prize: Hilary Mantel
Dayne Ogilvie Prize: Main award, C. E. Gatchalian; honours of distinction, Anand Mahadevan, Barry Webster
Dylan Thomas Prize: Battleborn by Claire Vaye Watkins
European Book Prize: Eduardo Mendoza, An Englishman in Madrid, and Arnaud Leparmentier, The French, gravediggers of the euro
German Book Prize: Terézia Mora, Das Ungeheuer
Goldsmiths Prize: A Girl Is a Half-formed Thing by Eimear McBride
Gordon Burn Prize: Pig Iron by Ben Myers
Governor General's Award for English-language fiction: The Luminaries by Eleanor Catton
Governor General's Award for French-language fiction: Quand les guêpes se taisent by Stéphanie Pelletier
Grand Prix du roman de l'Académie française: Plonger by Christophe Ono-dit-Biot
Hugo Award for Best Novel: John Scalzi for Redshirts
International Dublin Literary Award: City of Bohane by Kevin Barry
International Prize for Arabic Fiction: The Bamboo Stalk by Saud Alsanousi
Lambda Literary Awards: Multiple categories; see 2013 Lambda Literary Awards
Man Booker Prize: The Luminaries by Eleanor Catton
Miles Franklin Award: Questions of Travel by Michelle de Kretser
National Biography Award (5 August): The Two Frank Thrings by Peter Fitzpatrick
National Book Award for Fiction: The Good Lord Bird by James McBride
National Book Critics Circle Award: to Americanah by Chimamanda Ngozi Adichie
Nobel Prize in Literature: Alice Munro
PEN/Faulkner Award for Fiction: Everything Begins and Ends at the Kentucky Club by Benjamin Alire Sáenz
Premio Planeta de Novela: El cielo ha vuelto by Clara Sánchez
Premio Strega: Resistere non serve a niente by Walter Siti
Pritzker Military Library Literature Award: to Tim O'Brien
Prix Goncourt: Au revoir là-haut by Pierre Lemaitre
Pulitzer Prize for Fiction: The Orphan Master's Son by Adam Johnson
Pulitzer Prize for Poetry: Stag's Leap by Sharon Olds
Russian Booker Prize: Возвращение в Панджруд (Return to Panjrud) by Andrei Volos
SAARC Literary Award: Suman Pokhrel, Abhay K, Daya Dissanayake, Farheen Chaudhary, Abdul Khaliq Rashid 
Samuel Johnson Prize: (announced November 2013) The Pike by Lucy Hughes-Hallett
Scotiabank Giller Prize: Lynn Coady, Hellgoing
Whiting Awards: Fiction: Hannah Dela Cruz Abrams (fiction/nonfiction), Amanda Coplin, Jennifer duBois, C.E. Morgan, Stephanie Powell Watts; Nonfiction: Morgan Meis, Clifford Thompson; Plays: Virginia Grise; Poetry: Ishion Hutchinson, Rowan Ricardo Phillips
Women's Prize for Fiction: May We Be Forgiven by A.M. Homes
Zbigniew Herbert International Literary Award: W.S. Merwin

References

External links
2013: the year ahead in books at The Guardian
Most popular 2013 book articles viewed on Wikipedia, with user comments on traffic jumps – The latest statistics can be found on Wikitop

 
 
Years of the 21st century in literature